Abdus Sattar Chowdhury is a politician from the Dinajpur District of Bangladesh and an elected a member of parliament from Dinajpur-6.

Career 
Chowdhury was elected to parliament from Dinajpur-6 as an  independent candidate in 1988.

References 

Living people
Year of birth missing (living people)
Possibly living people
People from Dinajpur District, Bangladesh
4th Jatiya Sangsad members
Jatiya Party (Ershad) politicians